KC Motorgroup Ltd, known as KCMG, is an auto racing team based in Hong Kong.  Founded by former racing driver Paul Ip in 2007, KCMG has participated in a variety of championships across the world in touring car, sports car, and open-wheel racing.

History
KCMG entered the Formula Nippon series in 2010 as a Toyota customer team, with Katsuyuki Hiranaka finishing 12th. In 2011, Alexandre Imperatori finished 12th. In 2012, Ryo Orime finished 19th. In the 2013 Super Formula, Richard Bradley finished 21st. Yuichi Nakayama finished 20th in 2014, 16th in 2015, and 18th in 2016.

In 2013, KCMG expanded outside Asia with an entry in the 24 Hours of Le Mans before entering the FIA World Endurance Championship in 2014, during which the team won three races.  The team went on to win the 2015 24 Hours of Le Mans in the LMP2 category on its way to a second-place finish in the 2015 WEC season. However, in the following year, KCMG pared down its LMP2 participation to a one-off entry at Le Mans. KCMG did contest the full 2016 WEC season, albeit in the GTE Am category, finishing fourth in what would be its final season in the championship. 

Beginning in 2017, KCMG has partnered with Richard Childress Racing in the NASCAR Xfinity Series, sponsoring drivers Brandon Jones, Matt Tifft, Tyler Reddick and Earl Bamber. Reddick won the 2019 LTi Printing 250 with KCMG as the sponsor.

KCMG Driver Development Project
In April 2021, KCMG announced the launch of a new young driver programme named the KCMG Driver Development Project with Irish racer Alex Dunne being named as its first signing the following day. The program provides its members with dedicated coaching staff on race weekends, and physiotherapists, managers and tutors to improve their fitness, media skills and education.

Current members

Former members

Drivers
  Alexandre Imperatori (2011, 2013–2014, 2018–present)
  Matthew Howson(2013–2016)
  Ho-Pin Tung (2013)
  Richard Bradley (2013–2016)
  Tsugio Matsuda (2014–2016, 2018–present)
  Nick Tandy (2015)
  Nicolas Lapierre (2015)
  Christian Ried (2016)
  Wolf Henzler (2016)
  Joel Camathias (2016)
  Yuichi Nakayama (2014–2016, 2018)
  Katsuyuki Hiranaka (2010)
  Ryo Orime (2012)
  Kamui Kobayashi (2017–present)
  Katsumasa Chiyo (2019–present)
  Oliver Jarvis (2018–present)
  Brandon Jones (2017)
  Matt Tifft (2018)
  Tyler Reddick (2019)
  Josh Burdon (2018–present)
  Attila Tassi (2018–present)
  Kris Richard (2018–present)
  Tiago Monteiro (2019–present)
  Earl Bamber (2020)

Racing record

24 Hours of Le Mans results

FIA World Endurance Championship results

Formula Nippon/Super Formula results

References

External links
 

Hong Kong auto racing teams
Chinese auto racing teams
2007 establishments in Hong Kong
Auto racing teams established in 2007
FIA World Endurance Championship teams
24 Hours of Le Mans teams
Formula Nippon teams
Super Formula teams
Super GT teams
Japanese Formula 3 Championship teams
Formula Renault teams
Blancpain Endurance Series teams
WeatherTech SportsCar Championship teams
Toyota in motorsport
Nissan in motorsport
Porsche in motorsport
Racecar constructors